During the Parade of Nations section of the 1984 Winter Olympics opening ceremony, athletes from the participating countries marched into the arena. Each delegation was led by a flag bearer and a sign with the name of the country on it. The Parade of Nations was organized in Serbo-Croatian, the official language in Yugoslavia. As tradition dictates, Greece led the parade and Yugoslavia was the last to march to the stadium as the host nation.
Two nations were unable to march with their respective national flags, namely British Virgin Islands and Chinese Taipei. While Chinese Taipei was unable to use their flag and the name "Republic of China" due to participation of People's Republic of China, British Virgin Islands team was forced to use a replacement flag. The replacement flag is a white-colored cloth with the words “B. Djevičanska Ostrva” in blue color and the Olympic Rings on it. The organizers were unable to create the flag and created the replacement flag for the opening ceremony.

List

Notes

References

External links
Opening Ceremony of the 14th Winter Olympic Games - Youtube
Countries - Sports-Reference.com

Flag bearers
1984